was a Japanese ball-jointed doll maker, singer, songwriter, and guitarist. She became recognized in Japan for her doll work. Worldwide, Shizuka is best known for having been the founder and front woman of the rock band Shizuka.

Biography 
Shizuka Miura initiated in the art of dollmaking under the influence and mentorship of master dollmaker . Shizuka became recognized in Japan notably for her gothic ball-jointed dolls.

In circa 1992, Shizuka started her musical career by adapting her poetry into music. Initially, she rented venues and performed by herself. Shizuka soon formed an eponymous band with musicians from the Tokyo psychedelic underground scene. With the group, she worked on the release of a studio album, three live albums, and two video albums. Shizuka also performed in many live shows in Japan, two tours in the United States, and a festival in Scotland.

Shizuka died on circa 31 January 2010. Her cause of death was suicide. Mason Jones wrote that "it may have been due to medication", but it remains publicly unknown. On 25 April, a DVD-video album was released by PSF Records as a tribute to Shizuka containing one of the last live performances by her group recorded at the ShowBoat live venue in Tokyo on 30 December 2008.

Artistry

Dollmaking 
Shizuka made modern ball-jointed dolls. Her dolls have been described as "haunted, ethereal-looking", "stunning", "sickly-looking", "beautiful and spooky".

Musical influences 
Shizuka was prompted to compose music after seeing Maki Miura adapting a poems of hers to music. When asked about her favorite band, Shizuka cited Les Rallizes Dénudés specifically from the Japanese psychedelic scene.

Musical styles and voice 
Shizuka's music, together with her band, spanned psychedelic, folk, noise rock, acid rock, and neo-psychedelia. Musical instruments she played included guitar, and bells.

Shizuka possessed distinctive vocals: chanted, slow, plaintive, and tremulous, often connoting sadness and a "gothic atmosphere". Her vocals were imperfect and tuneless, but these aspects added an emotional edge as part of the band's style.

Songwriting 
Shizuka's band usual creative process started by listening to Shizuka singing lyrics, jam together, and only then arrange the song. She attributed the slow tempo in most of her music to she writing them at her natural pace, and not to a deliberate endeavor. She also said that she presented her inspirations, which in turn came from her personal experiences, in music. She wrote the song  based on her experience of having stomach cancer in the late 1980s while she also had a child who was only one and a half years old, and often performed this piece with her band because she considered it important to her.

Personal life 
Shizuka was married to Japanese guitarist Maki Miura. She had a child in the late 1980s, and also had stomach cancer around that time.

Discography

Notes

References

Further reading

External links 

 Shizuka (band) at Myspace

Dollmakers
20th-century Japanese artists
20th-century Japanese musicians
20th-century Japanese women artists
20th-century Japanese women singers
20th-century Japanese singers
21st-century Japanese artists
21st-century Japanese musicians
21st-century Japanese women singers
21st-century Japanese singers
21st-century Japanese women artists
Japanese folk singers
Japanese rock guitarists
Japanese rock musicians
Japanese women artists
Japanese women rock singers
Japanese women singer-songwriters
Artists from Tokyo
Singers from Tokyo
P.S.F. Records artists
2010 deaths
2010 suicides
Artists who committed suicide
Year of birth unknown
Suicides in Tokyo